Xintai is a county-level city in the central part of Shandong province, People's Republic of China.

History
Xintai has a long history dating back to the origins of the Chinese civilisation. In 1966, scientists concluded that a homo teeth fossil found in Xintai's Wuzhutai village belonged to a female teenager and that homo erectus were already living in the area five million years ago. Moreover, many primitive social sites belonging to ancient cultures were found on both sides of the Chaiwen River after archaeological excavations, such as the Dawenkou, Longshan and Yueshi cultures. This proves that the ancient Chinese had already created a prelude to the Oriental human civilisation in Xintai some four or five thousand years ago.
In the Shang and Zhou dynasties, Xintai served as the capital of the Qi (杞) state. In 219 BC, Qin Shi Huang held a ceremony at Mount Liangfu. Emperor Wu and Emperor Guangwu of the Han dynasty also held similar ceremonies in Xintai. Besides, there were numerous famous Chinese people from Xintai, such as peace activist Liu Xiahui and musician Shi Kuang.

In the early Qing dynasty, in order to improve transport between north and south China, the Yongzheng Emperor ordered the construction of a new connecting road. After Yangliu station was set up, Xintai became an important centre of transport between the north and south.

In August 2007, the Shandong coal mine flood killed 181 miners.

Climate
Xintai lies in the north temperate zone with a monsoon climate. The average annual temperatures is 13.2℃.

Administrative divisions
As 2012, this city is divided to 2 subdistricts, 17 towns and 1 township.
Subdistricts
Qingyun Subdistrict
Xinwen Subdistrict

Towns

Townships
Daijiazhuang Township

Economy
Xintai is an important area of production of foods, vegetables and petroleum. There are about 1,600 million tons of coal deposits, other mineral deposits include quartz, limestone and clay. The industrial structure of Xintai is centered on energy, building materials, machines and chemical engineering. There are more than 1,000 corporations of industry and mining.

Transport
The Cilai railway runs through the city. The Jinghu and the Boxu expressways converge there.

Demographics

References

External links
Chinadaily.com

Cities in Shandong
County-level divisions of Shandong
Tai'an